This was a doubles tennis event in a professional tennis tournament held in Biella, Italy, in the summer of 2017. 

Andre Begemann and Leander Paes were the defending champions but chose not to defend their title.

Attila Balázs and Fabiano de Paula won the title after defeating Johan Brunström and Dino Marcan 5–7, 6–4, [10–4] in the final.

Seeds

Draw

References
 Main Draw

Thindown Challenger Biella - Doubles
Tennis tournaments in Italy